Policy Address is the annual address by the Chief Executive of Hong Kong (Governor prior to the handover). The practice of giving annual policy address is mandated under Article 64 of the Basic Law, requiring the government to "present regular policy addresses to the Council".

The policy address was first introduced during the colonial period by Governor Sir Murray MacLehose in 1972 as "Address by His Excellency the Governor". It was modelled after the Queen's Speech in the United Kingdom and aimed to strengthen the communications with Hong Kong residents after the Hong Kong 1967 Leftist riots.

It used to be addressed in October, on the opening of the Legislative Council. In 2002, former Chief Executive Tung Chee-hwa changed it unilaterally to January, but it was returned to October by his successor, Donald Tsang. After Leung Chun-ying succeeded Tsang in 2012, he changed the policy address back to January. It was again changed back to October after Carrie Lam became Chief Executive in 2017.

Two weeks after the address, the chairman of the House Committee of the Legislative Council moves a Motion of Thanks, similar to Address in Reply motions in other legislatures, and members of the Council debate the Policy Address.

Most people see the policy address as useful and a way of predicting how the Chief Executive will operate.

List of policy addresses

There were no titles for the Policy Addresses before 1992.

See also
 State of the Union address

References

External links

 Official website
 Corpus of Political Speeches : Free access to political speeches by American and Chinese politicians, developed by Hong Kong Baptist University Library

Politics of Hong Kong